Clanculus denticulatus, common name the toothed clanculus, is a species of sea snail, a marine gastropod mollusk in the family Trochidae, the top snails.

Description
The size of the shell varies between 7 mm and 13 mm. The depressed, spirally grooved shell has a conical shape. It is pale reddish, ornamented with rows of white and brown spots. The; ribs are slightly granulated. The sutures are distinct and impressed. The lower part of the body whorl is nearly smooth. The white umbilicus is smooth inside, the edge furnished with a series of granules. The aperture is subquadrangular. The outer lip is crenulated at the edge. The columellar lip is smooth, with a large tooth at the inside and a little roughness on the outer side.

Distribution
This marine species occurs off Japan, the Philippines and Australia

References

 Gray, J.E. 1826. Mollusca. pp. 474–496 in King, P.P. (ed). Narrative of a survey of the intertropical and western coasts of Australia. Performed between the years 1818 and 1822. London : John Murray Vol. 2.
 Menke, C.T. 1843. Molluscorum Novae Hollandiae Specimen in Libraria Aulica Hahniana. Hannover : Hahniana 46 pp
 Wilson B. (1993) Australian marine shells. Prosobranch gastropods. Vol. 1. Odyssey Publishing, Kallaroo, Western Australia, 408 pp.  
 Jansen, P. 1995. A review of the genus Clanculus Montfort, 1810 (Gastropoda: Trochidae) in Australia, with description of a new subspecies and the introduction of a nomen novum. Vita Marina 43(1-2): 39-62

External links
 To Biodiversity Heritage Library (1 publication)
 To Encyclopedia of Life
 To GenBank (2 nucleotides; 0 proteins)
 To World Register of Marine Species
 

denticulatus
Gastropods described in 1827